Zoltán Szalontai (14 August 1956 – 24 November 2005) was a Hungarian wrestler. He competed in the men's freestyle 62 kg at the 1980 Summer Olympics.

References

1956 births
2005 deaths
Hungarian male sport wrestlers
Olympic wrestlers of Hungary
Wrestlers at the 1980 Summer Olympics
Sportspeople from Miskolc